Soviet basketball clubs in European and worldwide competitions is the performance record of men's professional basketball clubs from the former Soviet Union's top-tier level league, the USSR Premier League, in international competitions.

The finals

FIBA European Champions Cup (1st-tier)

Season to season

FIBA European Cup Winners' Cup (2nd-tier)

Season to season

FIBA Korać Cup (3rd-tier)

Season to season

See also
European basketball clubs in European and worldwide competitions from:
 Croatia
 Czechoslovakia
 France
 Greece
 Israel
 Italy
 Russia
 Spain
 Turkey
 Yugoslavia

Basketball in the Soviet Union